Belqeysabad (also Romanized as Belqeysābād; also known as Belqesābād) is a village in Yurchi-ye Gharbi Rural District, Kuraim District, Nir County, Ardabil Province, Iran. At the 2006 census, its population was 100, in 17 families.

References 

Towns and villages in Nir County